The SS Cape Jacob is a steam turbine-driven ship, first launched as the SS California. It was to be used by the Maritime Administration, and was delivered in 1962 and put under contract to the States Steamship Company. The ship was later transferred to the Military Sealift Command, and put into reserve status temporarily. It was then transferred to active duty as a prepositioning ship.

References 
 SS Cape Jacob (AK-5029) NavSource Online: Service Ship Photo Archive
 List of fast sealift ships Naval Sealift command ship
 Shipspotting site for the ship
 Ship overview Federation of American scientists

External links 
 National Defense Reserve Fleet Inventory 

Ships built in Newport News, Virginia
1961 ships
Ships of the United States Navy